Journal of Abnormal Child Psychology is the official publication of the International Society for Research in Child and Adolescent Psychopathology (ISRCAP).
This scientific journal publishes eight issues per year focusing on research in psychopathology in childhood and adolescence.

Current Editor:
Paul Frick, Louisiana State University, Baton Rouge, Louisiana

Founding Editor:
Herbert C. Quay, University of Miami, Coral Gables, Florida

External links 
 Society for Research in Child and Adolescent Psychopathology (ISRCAP)
 Journal of Abnormal Child Psychology Website
 Journal of Abnormal Child Psychology Editorial Board

Publications established in 1973
Springer Science+Business Media academic journals
Abnormal psychology journals
Developmental psychology journals
8 times per year journals

Child and adolescent psychiatry journals